Polylepion cruentum is a species of marine ray-finned fish from the family Labridae, the wrasses. This benthopelagic species occurs near reefs in deep water in the North Pacific Ocean. Its range extends from Okinawa east to the Society Islands and Hawaii. This species was first formally described as Bodianus russelli by Martin F. Gomon and John E. Randall in 1975 with the type locality given as Moku Manu near Oahu in Hawaii. When Gomon described the new genus Polylepion in 1977 he designated P. russelli as its type species. The specific name of this fish honours Peter E. Russell of Kaneoke on Oahu who collected and gave the holotype to the Bishop Museum in Honolulu.

References

russelli
Fish described in 1975